White Water Landing is a Shoot-the-Chutes ride at Dorney Park & Wildwater Kingdom amusement park in Allentown, Pennsylvania. It was built in 1993, 10 years after a sister park named Cedar Point built a defunct flume using the same name: White Water Landing (Cedar Point). This ride is identical to Snake River Falls at Cedar Point in Sandusky, Ohio. It is located in the upper side near Hydra the Revenge.

Experience
The ride uses a chain lift hill as opposed to the conveyor belt used on most water rides. The boat rises  then turns around under a tunnel at the top. The ride ends with a giant wave that drenches people on and off ride. A bridge is installed at the bottom of the hill where visitors can stand to get soaked.

References

External links
 Official White Water Landing page

Dorney Park & Wildwater Kingdom
Water rides
1993 establishments in Pennsylvania
Cedar Fair attractions